Sarah Perks is an international curator and producer of contemporary visual art, independent film and engagement. She will be Artistic Director for Visual Arts and Film of HOME, the centre for international contemporary arts, theatre and film formed by the merger of Cornerhouse and the Library Theatre Company. She is currently artistic director of Cornerhouse and is the founder of Cornerhouse Artist Film.

Career 
In January 2014, Perks curated Jamie Shovlin: Hiker Meat, a solo exhibition that included the new commission Rough Cut, an installation and feature-length film produced in partnership with Toronto International Film Festival and in competition at 43rd Rotterdam International Film Festival.

In 2011, Perks founded Cornerhouse Artist Film, a UK specialist distributor of artist feature film, starting with the UK and Ireland theatrical release of Self Made, the directorial debut of Turner Prize winning artist Gillian Wearing.

Perks is a lecturer, presenter and published author in contemporary culture, lecturing in a range of subjects from creative industries to postcolonialism at institutions including the Manchester Metropolitan University and the University of Manchester. She taught for several years at City College Manchester.

Through her career Perks has worked with a number of high-profile artists, including Phil Collins, Jeremy Deller, Rosa Barba, Gillian Wearing and David Shrigley. Curatorial credits also include the group show Anguish and Enthusiasm: What do you do with your revolution once you've got it??, Los Angeles performance and video artist Stanya Kahn: It’s Cool I’m Good.

Perks co-edited a special edition of Film International on film noir involving a range of artists, film makers and writers and is currently developing a book on artist feature film. In 2009, she was a British Council Creative Entrepreneur Finalist for Visual Arts.

References

External links
 
 Home Artistic Team

Living people
English artists
Artistic directors
Year of birth missing (living people)